Maysville is an unincorporated community in Allen and Hardin counties, in the U.S. state of Ohio.

History
Maysville was originally platted in Allen County, although it now reaches into Hardin County. The post office operated there under the name Hog Creek. This post office was established in 1841, and remained in operation until 1878.

References

Unincorporated communities in Allen County, Ohio
Unincorporated communities in Hardin County, Ohio
1841 establishments in Ohio
Populated places established in 1841
Unincorporated communities in Ohio